Raymondville is a hamlet in St. Lawrence County, New York, United States. Raymondville has a post office with ZIP code 13678.

References

Hamlets in St. Lawrence County, New York
Hamlets in New York (state)